An animal product is any material derived from the body of an animal. Examples are fat, flesh, blood, milk, eggs, and lesser known products, such as isinglass and rennet.

Animal by-products, as defined by the USDA, are products harvested or manufactured from livestock other than muscle meat.  In the EU, animal by-products (ABPs) are defined somewhat more broadly, as materials from animals that people do not consume.  Thus, chicken eggs for human consumption are considered by-products in the US but not France; whereas eggs destined for animal feed are classified as animal by-products in both countries.  This does not in itself reflect on the condition, safety, or wholesomeness of the product.

Animal by-products are carcasses and parts of carcasses from slaughterhouses, animal shelters, zoos and veterinarians, and products of animal origin not intended for human consumption, including catering waste. These products may go through a process known as rendering to be made into human and non-human foodstuffs, fats, and other material that can be sold to make commercial products such as cosmetics, paint, cleaners, polishes, glue, soap and ink. The sale of animal by-products allows the meat industry to compete economically with industries selling sources of vegetable protein.

The word animals includes all species in the biological kingdom Animalia, including, for example, tetrapods, arthropods, and mollusks. Generally, products made from fossilized or decomposed animals, such as petroleum formed from the ancient remains of marine animals are not considered animal products. Crops grown in soil fertilized with animal remains are rarely characterized as animal products. Products sourced from humans (ex; hair sold for wigs, donated blood) are not typically classified as animal products even though humans are part of the animal kingdom. 

Several popular diet patterns prohibit the inclusion of some categories of animal products and may also limit the conditions of when other animal products may be permitted. This includes but not limited to secular diets; like, vegetarian, pescetarian, and paleolithic diets, as well as religious diets, such as kosher, halal, mahayana, macrobiotic, and sattvic diets. Other diets, such as vegan-vegetarian diets and all its subsets exclude any material of animal origin. Scholarly, the term animal source foods (ASFs) has been used to refer to these animal products and by-products collectively.

In international trade legislation, the terminology products of animal origin (POAO) is used for referring to foods and goods that are derived from animals or have close relation to them.

Slaughterhouse waste

Slaughterhouse waste is defined as animal body parts cut off in the preparation of carcasses for use as food. This waste can come from several sources, including slaughterhouses, restaurants, stores and farms. In the UK, slaughterhouse waste is classed as category 3 risk waste in the Animal By-Products Regulations, with the exception of condemned meat which is classed as category 2 risk.

By-products in pet food
The leftover pieces that come from the process of stripping meat from animals tends to get used for different purposes. One of them is to put these parts into pet food. Many large, well-known pet food brands use animal by-products as protein sources in their recipes. This can include animal feet, livers, lungs, heads, spleens, etc or an admixture in the form of meat and bone meal. These organs are usually not eaten by humans depending on culture, but are safe and nutritious for pets regardless. By-products can also include bad-looking pieces. They are always cooked (rendered) to kill pathogens. Some pet food makers advertise the lack of by-products to appeal to buyers, a move criticized for contributing to food waste and reducing sustainability.

Additives
 Carmine, derived from crushed cochineal beetles, is a red or purple substance commonly used in food products. It is common in food products such as juice, candy, and yogurt. The presence of carmine in these products has been a source of controversy. One major source of controversy was the use of carmine in Starbucks frappuccinos. Carmine is an allergen according to the FDA. It takes about 70,000 female insects to produce a pound of dye.
 L-cysteine from human hair and pig bristles (used in the production of biscuits, bread and dietary supplements)
 Rennet (commonly used in the production of cheese)
 Shellac (commonly used for food dye, food glaze and medicine glaze)
 Swiftlet's nest (made of saliva)

Food

 Ambrosia, also known as “bee bread” (which is made from both plant pollen and the insect’s secretions)
 Arachnids 
 Blood, especially in the form of blood sausage
 Bone, including bone char, bone meal, etc.
 Broths and stocks are often created with animal fat, bone, and connective tissue
 Caviar  
 Casein (found in milk and cheese)
 Civet oil (food flavoring additive)
 Dairy products (e.g., milk, cheese, yogurt, etc.)
 Eggs and egg products (e.g., mayonnaise, eggnog, custard, etc.)
 Escargot pearls
 Fat (e.g., lard, lardon, schmaltz, suet, tallow, etc.)
 Gelatin (used to make candy, ice cream, and marshmallows)
 Hard roe (as food is used as a raw or cooked ingredient in various dishes)
 Honey (including comb honey products)
 Honeydew
 Isinglass (used in clarification of beer and wine)
 Insects (some edible insects are consumed whole or made into a powder, like cricket flour. The flours are then used to make products like insect fitness bars or burger patties.)
 Kopi luwak & Black Ivory Coffee
 Meat (which includes fish, shellfish, sauces made from them, and poultry in addition to livestock, game, and "exotic dishes" made from amphibians or reptiles)
 Offal
 Skins (remaining skin scraps as a by-product of meat production or fat rendering are made profitable by being fried/roasted and sold as snacks, like; gribenes, rinds, scratchings, and rambak)
 Snake wine (also used as medicine)
 Soft roe, also known as “white roe” (commonly fried, used as an ingredient in a larger dish, or used as a condiment in some European and Asian countries)
 Whey (found in cheese and added to many other products)

Non-food animal products

 Animal fiber
 Ambergris
 Beeswax
 Bear bile (used to make medicine)
 Blood and some blood substitutes (blood used for transfusions is always human in origin, though some blood substitutes are made from animal sources.  Many diagnostic laboratory tests use animal or human sourced reagents)
 Casein (used in plastics, clothing, cosmetics, adhesives and paint)
 Castoreum (secretion of the beaver used in perfumes and possibly in food flavoring)
 Civet oil
 Coral rock (Precious coral in particular is beloved for jewelry making) 
 Donkey milk
 Egg oil (used in skin care products as a preservative and as skin conditioning agent)
 Emu oil (serves as a ”natural” emollient in cosmetic preparations, especially in products that claim it has the ability enhance and maintain beauty.)
 Ejaculate (used in artificial insemination)
 Feathers
 Fishmeal
 Fur
 Gallstones (from livestock for Traditional Chinese Medicine)
 Guano
 Horse oil (used in East Asian skincare masks and creams for similar purposes as emu oil.)
 Horn, including antlers etc.
 Ivory
 Lanolin
 Limulus amebocyte lysate (a chemical in horseshoe crab blood used to detect bacterial endotoxin)
 Leather
 Manure
 Mink lashes
 Mink oil
 Musk
 Nautilus (decorative shell or pearl alternative)
 Ovine Placenta
 Pearl or mother of pearl (Treated as a precious gem for making jewelry or adorning clothing & accessories. Pearl powder is used as a natural skincare product for hydrating & healing the skin as well as lightening, brightening and maintaining youthfulness of the complexion) 
 Royal jelly (used as a dietary supplement)
 Scales (fish scales are often used in makeup to impart a refractive & pearlescent finish)
 Silk
 Sponges
 Skunk oil
 Snail Mucin (used in topical medications and skincare products as a treatment for lesions and acne or as an antioxidant to brighten and hydrate the skin)
 Stearin
 Tallow, may be used in food and soap
 Tortoiseshell
 Urine
 Venom (used to produce human and veterinary antivenin)
 Whale oil
 Wool

See also

Advanced meat recovery
Biodegradable waste
Boiling down
Food quality
Food safety
List of waste types
Meat extenders
Mechanically separated meat
Pink slime
Potted meat food product
Spam (food)
Veganism as alternatives to animal products

References

Further reading
 Extensive list identifying animal-derived and vegan ingredients
FDA Consumer Magazine: The Lowdown on Labels
Heinz, G. & Hautzinger, P. "Meat Processing Technology" , Food and Agriculture Organization, 2007, accessed March 30, 2012.
Leoci, R., Animal by-products (ABPs): origins, uses, and European regulations, Mantova (Italy): Universitas Studiorum, 2014. 
Mian N Riaz, Riaz N Riaz, Muhammad M Chaudry. Halal Food Production, CRC Press, 2004. 
Tsai, Michelle. "What's in a can of dog food?, Slate, March 19, 2007.
Earthly Origin of Materials, is a material animal, vegetable, or mineral?

 
Fat products
Animal rights
Animal welfare
Intensive farming
Meat
Meat industry
Pet foods
Veganism
Vegetarianism
Waste